Albania participated in the Eurovision Song Contest 2012 in Baku, Azerbaijan, with the song "Suus" performed by Rona Nishliu. Its selected entry was chosen through the national selection competition Festivali i Këngës organised by Radio Televizioni Shqiptar (RTSH) in December 2011. Prior to the contest, the song was promoted by a music video and live performances in Cyprus, Hungary, Montenegro, Romania and the Netherlands.

Albania was drawn to compete in the first semi-final of the Eurovision Song Contest 2012, which took place on 22 May 2012. Performing as number five, the nation was announced among the top 10 entries of the first semi-final and therefore qualified to compete in the grand final. In the final on 26 May 2012, it performed as number three and placed fifth out of the 26 participating countries, scoring 146 points.

Background 

During its tenure in the contest, Albania failed to qualify for the final three times, with the  entry being the most recent non-qualifier. The nation's national broadcaster, Radio Televizioni Shqiptar (RTSH), has organised Festivali i Këngës since its inauguration in 1962. Since 2003, the winner of the competition has simultaneously won the right to represent Albania in the Eurovision Song Contest.

Before Eurovision

Festivali i Këngës 

Radio Televizioni Shqiptar (RTSH) organised the 50th edition of Festivali i Këngës in order to select Albania's representative for the Eurovision Song Contest 2012. The competition consisted of two semi-finals on 26 and 27 December, respectively, and the grand final on 29 December 2011. The three live shows were hosted by Albanian television presenter Enkeleida Zeko, Albanian model Hygerta Sako and Albanian actor Nik Xhelilaj. In October 2011, the broadcaster published a provisory list of 28 competing artists that were shortlisted to compete in the two semi-finals of the contest. In December, a few days prior to the scheduled live shows, RTSH ultimately released the songs and composers of the competing artists.

Competing entries

Shows

Semi-finals 

The two semi-finals of Festivali i Këngës took place on 26 December and 27 December 2011, and were broadcast live at 20:30 (CET) on the respective dates. 14 songs competed in each semi-final, with 10 entries in the first and second semi-final, respectively, qualifying for the grand final. The interval acts for the semi-finals featured guest performances by Nigerian singer Eddy Wata and English singer Katherine Ellis.

Final 

The grand final of Festivali i Këngës took place on 29 December 2011 and was broadcast live at 20:30 (CET). The winner was determined by the combination of the votes from a seven-member jury, consisting of Aldo Shllaku, Edi Xhani, Ndriçim Xhepa, Redon Makashi, Robert R, Zana Shuteriqi and Zhani Ciko. Each member of the jury voted by assigning scores from 1–8, 10 and 12 points to their preferred songs. Rona Nishliu emerged as the winner and was simultaneously announced as the country's representative for the Eurovision Song Contest 2012. The results of the final are summarised in the table below:

Promotion 

A music video for "Suus" premiered via the Eurovision Song Contest's official YouTube channel of the Eurovision Song Contest on 17 March 2012. For promotional purposes, Nishliu embarked on a small tour with live performances at various at various events related to the contest, including in Cyprus, Hungary, Montenegro, Romania and the Netherlands.

At Eurovision 

The Eurovision Song Contest 2012 took place at Baku Crystal Hall in Baku, Azerbaijan, and consisted of two semi-finals held on 22 and 24 May, respectively, and the grand final on 26 May 2012.

On 25 January 2012, a special allocation draw was held at the Buta Palace in Baku that placed each country into one of the two semi-finals, as well as which half of the show they would perform in. Albania was placed into the first semi-final, to be held on 22 May, and was scheduled to perform in the first half of the show. Once all the competing songs for the 2012 contest had been released, the running order for the semi-finals was decided by the producers of the contest rather than through another draw, for preventing similar songs being placed next to each other; Albania was set to perform in position 5, following  and preceding .

At the end of the show, the country was announced among the top 10 entries in the first semi-final and therefore qualified to compete in the grand final. Soon after the first semi-final, it was announced that it would be performing third in the grand final, following  and preceding .

Voting 

The tables below visualise a breakdown of points awarded to Albania in both the first semi-final and the grand final of the Eurovision Song Contest 2012, as well as by the country on both occasions. In the final, Albania finished in fifth position, being awarded a total of 146 points, including 12 awarded by Italy,  and Switzerland. Albania awarded its 12 points to Montenegro in the semi-final, and to Greece in the final of the contest.

Points awarded to Albania

Points awarded by Albania

References 

2012
Countries in the Eurovision Song Contest 2012
2011
Eurovision
Eurovision